Taxation in Hungary is levied by both national and local governments. Tax revenue in Hungary stood at 38.4% of GDP in 2017.  The most important revenue sources include the income tax, Social security, corporate tax and the value added tax, which are all applied at the national level. Among the total tax income the ratio of local taxes is solely 5% while the EU average is 30%.

Income tax in Hungary is levied at a flat rate of 15%. A tax allowance is given through a family allowance, which is equal to the allowance multiplied by the number of "beneficiary dependent children". For one or two children the allowance is HUF 62,500 per child, for three or more HUF 206,250 per child. The allowance can be split between spouses or life partners.

The standard rate of value added tax is 27% as of January 2012 — the highest in the European Union. There is a reduced rate of 5% for most medicines and some food products, and a reduced rate of 18% for internet connections, restaurants and catering, dairy and bakery products,  hotel services and admission to short-term open-air events.

In January 2017, corporate tax was unified at a rate of 9% — the lowest in the European Union. Dividends received are not subject to taxation, provided that are not received from a Controlled Foreign Company (CFC). Capital gains are included in corporate tax, with certain exemptions.

Employment income is subject to social security contributions for the employer at a flat rate of 17,5%. Capital gains are taxed at a flat rate of 15%.

History
After the Ottoman conquest of central parts of Hungary, the most common tax was the Ottoman administration's levy on Christians the dhimmi. Under Austro-Hungarian rule, taxes were mostly levied by Austria, but Hungary was later given more financial autonomy in the Austro-Hungarian Compromise of 1867. In 1988, liberalization of the Soviet-influenced Kádár government introduced tax reform, establishing a comprehensive tax system of central and local taxes, consisting mainly of a personal income tax, a corporate income tax and a value added tax.

References